The 1946 Nebraska College Conference football season was the season of college football played by the nine member schools of the Nebraska College Conference (NCC) as part of the 1946 college football season.  The Doane Tigers from Crete, Nebraska were led by head coach James L. Dutcher and compiled an overall record of 6–2–1 with a mark of 5–0–1 in conference play, winning the NCC championship. The Nebraska Wesleyan Plainsmen  were led by head coach George W. Knight. They finished second in the conference with a  5–0–2 record in conference play and a mark of 7–0–3 overall in the regular season. They then lost to Pepperdine in the Will Rogers Bowl.

None of the NCC teams was ranked in the Associated Press poll.

Conference overview

Teams

Doane

The 1946 Doane Tigers football team was an American football team that represented Doane University as a member of the Nebraska College Conference (NCC) during the 1946 college football season. In their fifth year under head coach James L. Dutcher, the team compiled a 6–2–1 record (5–0–1 against NCC opponents), won the NCC championship, and outscored opponents by a total of 136 to 78.

Nebraska Wesleyan

The 1946 Nebraska Wesleyan Plainsmen football team represented Nebraska Wesleyan University as a member of the Nebraska College Conference (NCC) during the 1946 college football season.  Led by head coach George W. Knight, the Plainsmen compiled a 7–1–3 (4-0-2 against NCC opponents), outscored opponent by a total of 169 to 37, and finished second in the NCC. They were invited to play in the Will Rogers Bowl in Oklahoma City on New Year's Day, losing to Pepperdine by a 38–13 score.

Kearney State

The 1946 Kearney State Antelopes football team represented Nebraska State Teachers College at Kearney (now known as University of Nebraska at Kearney) as a member of the Nebraska College Conference (NCC) during the 1946 college football season.  Led by head coach Charlie Foster, the Antelopes compiled a 6–2–1 record (5-2-1 against NCC opponents), outscored opponent by a total of 116 to 49, and finished third in the NCC.

Peru State

The 1946 Peru State Bobcats football team represented Peru State Teachers College (now known as Peru State College) as a member of the Nebraska College Conference (NCC) during the 1946 college football season.  Led by head coach Alfred G. Wheeler, the Bobcats compiled a 4–4–1 record (4-3-1 against NCC opponents), outscored opponents by a total of 116 to 100, and finished fourth in the NCC.

Other coaches included Wayne Riggs. For the prior three years, Navy V-12 students comprised the majority of Peru's football team. With the 1946, the team returned to non-military status.

Midland

The 1946 Midland Warriors football team represented Midland University of Fremont, Nebraska, as a member of the Nebraska College Conference (NCC) during the 1946 college football season.  Led by head coach John Pfitsch, the Warriors compiled a 4–4 record (4-3 against NCC opponents), outscored opponents by a total of 89 to 73, and finished fifth in the NCC.

Wayne State

The 1946 Wayne State Wildcats football team represented Midland University of Wayne, Nebraska, as a member of the Nebraska College Conference (NCC) during the 1946 college football season.  Led by head coach Don B. Emery, the Warriors compiled a 4–3 record (2-3 against NCC opponents), outscored opponents by a total of 69 to 33, and finished sixth in the NCC.

Hastings

The 1946 Hastings Broncos football team represented Hastings College of Hastings, Nebraska, as a member of the Nebraska College Conference (NCC) during the 1946 college football season.  Led by head coach Larry Owens, the Broncos compiled a 1–6–1 record (1–4–1 against NCC opponents), were outscored by a total of 123 to 45, and finished seventh in the NCC.

Chadron State

The 1946 Chadron State Eagles football team represented Chadron State College of Chadron, Nebraska, as a member of the Nebraska College Conference (NCC) during the 1946 college football season.  Led by head coach Ross O. Armstrong, the Eagles compiled a 3–7 record (1–5 against NCC opponents), were outscored by a total of 230 to 70, and finished eighth in the NCC.

York

The 1946 York Panthers football team represented York University of York, Nebraska, as a member of the Nebraska College Conference (NCC) during the 1946 college football season.  Led by head coach Rolland E. Tonkin, the Eagles compiled a 3–6 record (0–6 against NCC opponents), were outscored by a total of 138 to 92, and finished last in the NCC.

All-conference team
The United Press (UP) and the NCC coaches each selected 1946 All-Nebraska College Conference football teams. NCC champion Doane did not place any players on the UP team. The all-conference picks were as follows:

 Quarterback: Rex Mercer, Nebraska Wesleyan (UP)
 Halfbacks: Dick Peterson, Kearney (UP, Coaches); Johnny Warwick, Hastings  (Coaches); Revoe Hill, Midland (UP, Coaches)
 Fullback: Al Butterfield, Chadron (UP, Coaches)
 Ends: John Rumbaugh, Kearney (UP, Coaches); Rich Clough, Midland (UP); Orville Yocup, Peru (Coaches)
 Tackles: Bob Westphal, Wayne (UP, Coaches); Everett Poe, Nebraska Wesleyan (UP); Don Redman, Doane (Coaches)
 Guards: Wayne Linder, Peru (UP); Ralph Patterson, Kearney (UP, Coaches); Dick Uphoff, Hastings (Coaches)
 Center: Cliff Squires, Nebraska Wesleyan (UP, Coaches)

References